The 1979 Fort Lauderdale Strikers season was the third season of the Fort Lauderdale Striker's team, and the club's thirteenth season in professional soccer. The Strikers finished the regular season in second place in the Eastern Division of the North American Soccer League's American Conference, and qualified for the playoffs. They were eliminated in the first round of the playoffs.

Background

Review

Competitions

Friendlies

NASL regular season 

Regular season
W = Wins, L = Losses, GF = Goals For, GA = Goals Against, BP = Bonus Points, Pts = Point System

6 points for a win, 1 point for a shootout win, 0 points for a loss, 1 point for each regulation goal scored up to three per game.

American Conference

Results summaries

Results by round

Match reports

NASL Playoffs

First round

Bracket

Match reports

Statistics

Transfers

See also
1979 Fort Lauderdale Strikers

References 

1979
Fort Lauderdale Strikers
Fort Lauderdale
Fort Lauderdale Strikers